SuperCard is a high-level development environment that runs on Macintosh computers, under OS 8 and 9, and OS X. It is inspired by HyperCard, but includes a richer language, a full GUI toolkit, and native color (as opposed to HyperCard's Apple- or third-party-supplied add-ons).

The programming language used by SuperCard is called SuperTalk, and is largely based on HyperTalk, the language in HyperCard. In addition to the core language, SuperTalk can call out to OSA-based scripting languages such as AppleScript, and shell commands. The language can be extended with so-called externals, chunks of compiled code that appear like native routines.

Programs created using SuperCard can be run inside the IDE itself, or as "standalones", which combine the user-created programs and resources with the execution engine used by SuperCard.

History

The early years
SuperCard was first created by Bill Appleton and published by Silicon Beach Software in 1989. Appleton combined elements from World Builder, that he wrote, HyperCard, SuperPaint and the Macintosh user interface.

In 1990, Silicon Beach was acquired by Aldus Corporation. Aldus released version 1.6 of SuperCard which brought support for AppleEvents, enhanced graphic capabilities and several other improvements.

Mid-1990s
In February 1994, Allegiant Technologies of San Diego bought SuperCard. Allegiant released several versions of the software, and even won the 1995 MacUser Editor's Choice for Best New Multimedia-Authoring Application. Version 1.7 of SuperCard, which was released in June 1994, included several important enhancements, including QuickTime support and switch statements. In December of the same year, version 2.0 was released. This was the first PowerPC native version, which made it a lot faster than previous versions on newer machines. Also, this version introduced an application called Standalone Maker, which put a front end on the ability to edit the resource fork of executable SuperCard projects. SuperCard had always been able to produce stand alone executable applications, but this tool lowered the barrier to entry for novice users. Version 2.0 and 2.5 were released in Japanese-language versions. Version 2.5 also added full 24-bit color, and QuickTime VR support.

Late 1990s
Several versions of SuperCard were released thereafter, that included features such as support for full 24-bit color and improvements of the filmstrip feature. In early 1996, a new companion product called Marionet was released. This add-on allowed projects to communicate over local networks or the Internet, offering server-side functionality and foreshadowing the robust web application era of today.

 Twenty months later, the third version of SuperCard was released. This new version sported a new project file format supporting user properties, and a completely new Project Editor.

Allegiant's goal was to keep innovating on the Macintosh product, while delivering a Windows runtime environment (edit on the Mac, run on Windows or Mac) and ultimately a Windows authoring environment. The firm went through three different attempts to bring a Windows version of SuperCard to the public. The first was a true "port" of the product (which would have included both editing and runtime environments on Windows), however it was taking too long and was very unstable due to the lack of a robust graphical "toolbox" such as the one offered on the Mac platform. It was determined that it would be unfeasible to use the Macintosh source code as a basis for porting to Windows at the time, so a second was an attempt to make a runtime-only environment that supported most of the capabilities of SuperCard, but under a brand new code base that was written from the ground up with new engineers. This version was more stable, but ultimately did not make it to market (although it formed the basis for the Roadster plugin (see below)). The third attempt was very short-lived, but was based on conversations with Apple related to QuickTime Interactive (QTi), which was going to provide a Quicktime-based environment that could be used to create a Quicktime-based development and authoring tool using the SuperTalk language.

Ultimately, the firm also created a SuperCard browser plugin called "Roadster" in 1996 to run "projects" — the SuperCard version of stacks. Roadster supported a subset of SuperCard's capabilities, but since it was a web plugin, it was the first time that SuperCard content could be played on Windows.

In May 1998, Incwell DMG acquired SuperCard and all related products from Allegiant. Shortly thereafter, version 3.5 was announced. This version, which was finally released in October 1998, was faster than its predecessors, had support for QuickTime 3, Drag and Drop, and more. Incwell also cut the price in half compared to previous versions.

Version 3.6, released in 1999, brought a Japanese version and many internal improvements.

The 21st century
In 2002, SuperCard was acquired for the fourth time. This time, Solutions Etcetera, the company that had been developing SuperCard for IncWell, bought the product, and announced version 4. This new version introduced Mac OS X support, complete theme compliance and a wide range of user interface elements to go with it.

Since then, versions up to 4.8 have been released, bringing improvements and bug fixes, native support for Apple's new Intel-Chip-Based Macs, IDE enhancements, extended numeric precision, anti-aliased draw graphics, and expanded shell support.

As of March 2023, SuperCard 4.8.1 is not compatible with macOS Catalina or later due to the removal of 32-bit application support in macOS.

References

External links
Solutions Etcetera's official SuperCard web site
Fourth World's SuperCard history
ScriptLib.net, an online collaborative script library for SuperCard
ModuloPi, an alternative Runtime editor for SuperCard

Classic Mac OS software
MacOS programming tools
Aldus software
1989 software